Rosa Lund (born 4 December 1986, in Copenhagen) is a Danish politician, who is a member of the Folketing for the Red–Green Alliance (Danish: Enhedslisten) political party. She was elected at the 2019 Danish general election, and previously sat in parliament from 2011 to 2015.

Education 
Lund studied at the University of Copenhagen between 2009-2018 and has a bachelor's degree in political science and a master's degree in law.

Political career
Lund was first elected into parliament at the 2011 election, where she received 1,150 votes. She ran again at the 2015 election, receiving 1,463	votes. Despite this being more votes than she received at the 2011 election, it wasn't enough for a parliamentary seat. This result led her to become the Red-Green Alliance's primary substitute in the Copenhagen constituency. She was called upon once during the term, acting as substitute for Johanne Schmidt-Nielsen from 5 March 2018 to 28 February 2019. At the 2019 election, she received 3,653	and was elected directly into parliament.

Sentence 
On October 6, 2007, Rosa Lund broke into a private property on Grøndalsvænge Allé in Copenhagen's North East in connection with the abolishment of the Youth House on Jagtvej 69. She was arrested by police and subsequently fined DKK 750 for illegal intrusion following Danish penal code's paragraph 264.

When Rosa Lund as political education spokesman and MP for Red–Green Alliance in 2012 was interviewed to MetroXpress about the sentence she said:

The legal spokesmen of Conservative and Danish People's Party called the remark respectively ”problematic” og ”unheard-of”. In February 2021 Pernille Vermund (NB) asked in Parliament whether the quote to MetroXpress was still Rosa Lund's opinion. In response Rosa Lund replied "No".1:13:24

References

External links 
 Biography on the website of the Danish Parliament (Folketinget)

1986 births
Living people
Politicians from Copenhagen
Red–Green Alliance (Denmark) politicians
Women members of the Folketing
21st-century Danish women politicians
Members of the Folketing 2011–2015
Members of the Folketing 2019–2022
Members of the Folketing 2022–2026